Azeez Shobowale Shobola (born 31 January 1992) is a Nigerian footballer who currently plays for Al-Nahda Club (Oman).

Football & Club career 
Azeez began his professional career with Abubakar Bukola Saraki's ABS FC (formerly Bukola Babes) where he spent two seasons from 2009 to 2011. His performance at the club secured him a contract with Dolphins F.C. (Port Harcourt) for the 2012 season, when he joined Shooting Stars S.C. (3SC) in Ibadan. Azeez also played for 3SC between 2012 and 2013 before leaving for the northern club Kano Pillars F.C. which won the Nigeria Professional Football League in his first season.

After three successful seasons with Pillars, he attracted interest from international clubs, and in 2016 moved to Al-Hilal Club (Omdurman) in Sudan.

Azeez was called up for the "Super Eagles", the Nigeria national football team, in  2016 for that year's African Nations Championship.

Achievements
With: Al-Hilal
Sudan Premier League
Champion (2): 2016, 2017
Sudan Cup
Winner (1): 2016

With: Kano Pillars F.C.
Nigeria Premier League
Champion (1): 2014

References 

Living people
1992 births
Nigerian footballers
Dolphin F.C. (Nigeria) players
Kano Pillars F.C. players
Al-Hilal Club (Omdurman) players
Al-Ain FC (Saudi Arabia) players
Al-Nahda Club (Oman) players
Saudi First Division League players
Oman Professional League players
Nigerian expatriates in Saudi Arabia
Expatriate footballers in Saudi Arabia
Nigerian expatriate sportspeople in Sudan
Expatriate footballers in Sudan
Nigerian expatriates in Oman
Expatriate footballers in Oman
Place of birth missing (living people)
Association football forwards